Alcidodes elegans is a species of the true weevil family. It occurs in Papua New Guinea

References

 Universal Biological Indexer
 Zipcodezoo

Alcidinae
Endemic fauna of Papua New Guinea
Arthropods of New Guinea
Beetles described in 1838